Furcaspidina is a subtribe of armored scale insects, traditionally regarded as part of the Aspidiotini. While the subtribe Furcaspidina was not mentioned in Takagi's 2002 study, the Aspidiotini were not deemed as problematical as the Diaspidini and Lepidosaphidini. In 2006, Williams reduced the Furcaspidina to a single genus, with about twenty-eight species. Andersen in 2009 suggested that the Furcaspidina belonged in an expanded subfamily of Diaspidinae; however, additional analysis suggests that the furcaspids are better placed in a distinct, but laterally equivalent subfamily to the Diaspidinae, possibly together with the gymnaspids which Borchsenius placed in the Aspidiotinae subfamily.

Genera
Furcaspis

Former genera
Hemigymnaspis Lindinger
Neofurcaspis MacGillivray is a junior synonym of Furcaspis
Paraonidiella MacGillivray is a junior synonym of Furcaspis
Separaspis MacGillivray is a junior synonym of Furcaspis
Stringaspidiotus MacGillivray belongs in the subtribe Pseudaonidiina of the Aspidiotini
Tollaspidiotus MacGillivray is a junior synonym of Furcaspis
Truncaspidiotus MacGillivray is a junior synonym of Furcaspis

References

Aspidiotini